Brij Khandelwal of Agra is a well known journalist and environmentalist.

Khandelwal became a journalist after his course from the Indian Institute of Mass Communication in New Delhi in 1972. He has worked for various newspapers and agencies including the Times of India. He has also worked with UNI, NPA, Gemini News London, India Abroad, Everyman's Weekly (Indian Express), and India Today.  Khandelwal has edited Jan Saptahik of Lohia Trust, reporter of George Fernandes's Pratipaksh, correspondent in Agra for Swatantra Bharat, Pioneer, Hindustan Times, and Dainik Bhaskar until 2004). He wrote mostly on developmental subjects and environment, and edited Samiksha Bharti, Newspress Weekly. He has worked in many parts of India.

He has authored two books on the environment, Towards New Environment and Taj Mahal in Pollution Cauldron: A Reporter's Diary.

Over years he has written thousands of news stories and articles published in various newspapers and periodicals all over.
He figured in a National Geographic TV channel film on the Taj Mahal. Also in BBC's India on Four Wheels, and CNN's documentary on the Yamuna and the Taj Mahal.

Khandelwal has been actively involved in saving the river Yamuna in the Braj region.

Presently he is associated with the international news agency IANS and the Times of India.
He has taught journalism at the Agra University for 15 years and is presently with the Central Hindi Institute's department of journalism and mass communication. His political stance is slightly left of the centre.

He has been associated with the Braj Mandal Heritage Conservation Society, Design for Change, Sri Nathji Nishulk Jal Sewa, and the My Clean India campaign. He has also worked with various human rights groups.
 
Khandelwal is married to Padmini K Iyer, an ex-Tamil journalist. They have one daughter, Mukta who is married and settled in Mysore.

References

External links
http://www.agratoday.in

Journalists from Uttar Pradesh